Cerconota tholodes is a moth of the family Depressariidae. It is found in Guyana.

The wingspan is about 22 mm. The forewings are light brownish, towards the base of the costa tinged with violet-pinkish and with the costal edge pale yellowish, at the base dark fuscous. There is an undefined area of violet-fuscous suffusion occupying the anterior three-fifths of the wing except towards the costa and there are small dark violet-fuscous spots on the costa before one-third and at the middle, and a narrow flattencd-triangular spot extending from beyond the middle to five-sixths, where a series of cloudy dark fuscous dots, somewhat curved in the disc, runs to the dorsum before the tornus. The terminal area beyond this is suffused with violet-fuscous and there is a series of dark fuscous marginal marks around the apex and termen, obscurely separated with pale yellowish. The hindwings are dark grey, lighter towards the base.

References

Moths described in 1915
Cerconota
Taxa named by Edward Meyrick